René Blum may refer to:

 René Blum (impresario) (1878–1942), French ballet choreographer
 René Blum (politician) (1889–1967), Luxembourgian politician